Tomb Raider Chronicles is an action-adventure platform video game developed by Core Design and published in 2000 by Eidos Interactive for PlayStation, Microsoft Windows and Dreamcast. Following Tomb Raider: The Last Revelation, series protagonist Lara Croft is presumed dead, and a group of friends attend a memorial service at her home to recount tales of her earlier exploits. Gameplay follows Lara through linear levels, solving puzzles and fighting enemies. Some levels incorporate additional gameplay elements such as stealth.

Despite the presumed death of Lara Croft in The Last Revelation, Core Design was told by Eidos to continue the series; while a new team worked on The Angel of Darkness for the PlayStation 2, a veteran team developed Chronicles based on concepts cut from The Last Revelation. Chronicles received mixed reviews from critics, being cited as running out of ideas for the series on the original PlayStation engine, and is remembered as one of the weakest Tomb Raider games, and at 1.5 million units is one of the worst-selling games in the series.

Gameplay

Tomb Raider Chronicles is an action-adventure video game in which the player assumes the role of archaeologist-adventurer Lara Croft, exploring a series of ancient ruins and tombs in search of ancient artefacts. The events of Chronicles are portrayed as a series of flashbacks to adventures at different points in Lara's life. The levels are split between four locations; Rome, the coast of Russia, an island near Ireland, and a corporate building in New York City. The Windows version includes a level editor, allowing players to create levels using available Tomb Raider architecture and mechanics.

As with earlier Tomb Raider titles, the game is presented from a third person perspective with a camera system which moves with Lara or remains fixed depending on the environment. Key to progress is solving puzzles scattered through the level, which can rely on pulling different types of switches, completing platforming challenges, or finding key items. Gameplay is mostly carried over from Tomb Raider: The Last Revelation; Lara is navigated via tank controls, can jump in four directions, walk, sprint, crawl and roll through narrow areas, swim and wade through bodies of water, climb up and along ledges and ladders, and use monkey bars to traverse gaps. New additions are her ability to walk along tightropes, swing from horizontal poles, and flip out of crawl spaces.

She can search the area, including cupboards, for items such as medipacks and secrets. She has access to several tools including binoculars for seeing far off areas, a grapple gun for creating ropes to swing on, and a crowbar that can be used contextually to break locks. Combat focuses on Lara firing at enemies with her equipped weapon; they are her trademark pistols with unlimited ammunition, weapons that can be found in levels such as a sniper rifle. Each level has specific themes and mechanics or styles; the Rome levels are inspired by earlier Tomb Raider titles, the Russian levels includes an Extreme Depth Suit for exploration in an underwater area, the Ireland levels portray a young Lara without access to weapons, while the New York levels focus on stealth and give Lara limited ammunition for her weapon.

Plot
Following the events of The Last Revelation, Lara Croft is presumed dead, buried under the collapsed Great Pyramid of Giza. At Lara's home of Croft Manor, three former friends and associates—Lara's butler Winston, the family priest Father Patrick Dunstan and Lara's history teacher Charles Kane—reminisce over some of Lara's early exploits following a memorial service.

The first story follows Lara's quest through the catacombs of Rome in search of the Philosopher's stone. She is pursued by Larson Conway and Pierre DuPont, adversaries she would later encounter during the events of Tomb Raider. The second story, recounted by Kane, sees Lara hunting the Spear of Destiny, lost on the ocean floor since World War II. Infiltrating Zapadnaya Litsa, she smuggles herself aboard a Russian Naval submarine commanded by Admiral Yarofev and his Mafia handler Sergei Mikhailov, who also seeks the Spear. Lara recovers the Spear, but she is ambushed by Mikhailov. The Spear's power is unleashed, killing Mikhailov, damaging the submarine and wounding Yarofev. Lara leaves in an escape pod, but Yarofev remains behind as the Spear destroys the submarine.

The third story, told by Dunstan, follows a teenage Lara when she secretly follows Dunstan to an island haunted by demonic forces. Lara confronts several apparitions and monsters which inhabit the island, including a horse-riding humanoid demon called Vladimir Kaleta who was trapped in a prison of running water by the island's former monastic community. Dunstan is taken hostage by Kaleta, who forces Lara to block the river imprisoning him. Using a book discovered in the ruined monastery's library, Lara says Kaleta's demon name "Verdelet", taking control of him and banishing him from Earth. The fourth story, related by Winston, shows Lara infiltrating the New York corporate headquarters of her former mentor Werner Von Croy to retrieve the Iris, the pursuit of which first caused the schism between Lara and Von Croy.

Their stories completed, the three toast Lara. In parallel to these events, Von Croy digs through the rubble of the Great Pyramid in a desperate attempt to find her. He finally discovers Lara's backpack among the ruins of the Great Pyramid but no sign of her body: he declares "We've found her!", presuming that Lara is alive.

Development and release
Core Design, developers of Tomb Raider since its inception, had grown fatigued of the series after producing three games successively since completing the original game. The team had attempted killing off Lara in The Last Revelation, but Eidos insisted that the series continue. Core Design split into two teams; one new team worked on Tomb Raider: The Angel of Darkness for PlayStation 2, while a veteran team developed Chronicles. Most of the team from The Last Revelation returned to create Chronicles. Designer Andy Sandham, speaking in a 2016 retrospective on the Core Design Tomb Raider games, said that the staff created the game to earn a living rather than having any passion for it, deeming it as the worst title in his career. In a different interview, he called it the hardest Tomb Raider title he worked on. Reportedly the lead animator had fun creating new death animations for Lara, as the team as a whole disliked the project. The full-motion video cutscenes were created by ExMachina, a French studio which had previously worked on a number of video game projects including Final Fantasy IX and Dark Earth, in addition to a series of SEAT commercials featuring Lara.

Each area was designed around a different gameplay theme; Rome emulated classic Tomb Raider platforming, Russia was focused on action and stealth elements, Ireland forced players to handle a version of Lara without weapons, and the fourth area brought more stealth elements and new elements such as a companion helping Lara remotely. Several level ideas were originally pitched for The Last Revelation before Jeremy Heath-Smith, the head of Core Design, insisted that the latter game focus on tomb-based environments. As with The Last Revelation, a separate tutorial area based in Lara's home was removed to reduce the workload. Several gameplay elements were expanded and refined, including new moves including the tightrope walk and refining the inventory UI. For the PC version, Core Design released the level building tools as a level editor on a second disc. This was done as Chronicles would be the last game using that generation of technology, and they wanted to allow fans the freedom to create levels of their own.

The script was written by Sandham, based on a story by Sandham and Richard Morton. Chronicles was a direct follow-up to The Last Revelation, continuing to assume that Lara was dead. Due to this style, the narrative structure broke away from the linear style used in earlier titles in favour of an anthology format, with four separate adventures loosely tied together by framing sequences. Sandham wrote the game's script after the game's level structure was finalised. There were several continuity errors in the Rome segment of Chronicles related its chronological placement and Pierre's apparent death, attributed by Sandham to not referring to the original game's script beforehand. The use of flashbacks rather than a continuous contemporary narrative allowed Core Design to create very different levels without being tied together with an overarching story. It was also designed to close off the original era of Tomb Raider—including its technology and storyline—prior to the release of The Angel of Darkness. The Irish levels were included by Sandham, who had a love of Irish folklore and was inspired by the cover art of The Black Island, a book from The Adventures of Tintin. Jean-Yves, a character from The Last Revelation, was originally part of the narrative and narrator of the Russian section. Due to a controversy about the character's similarity to real-life archaeologist Jean-Yves Empereur, Jean-Yves was replaced with Charles Kane.

The music was composed by Peter Connelly, who returned from The Last Revelation. As with other his other projects, Connelly used early level builds as inspiration for his compositions. Taking inspiration from the narrative's gloomy tone, Chronicles used a darker musical style while retaining established Tomb Raider musical motifs. The main theme is very short compared to earlier Tomb Raider games, but Connelly had wanted something "epic". Time constraints meant that Chronicles did not have a proper main theme, with the closest being an opening segment that was inspired by Connelly's original plans.

Chronicles was announced in August 2000 for PlayStation, Microsoft Windows and Dreamcast for a release in November of that year. Eidos marketed Chronicles extensively through commercials alongside promotional ads for the movie adaptation Lara Croft: Tomb Raider. Development was completed on 15 November, with Eidos confirming that the game was declared gold (indicating that it was being prepared for duplication and release). Chronicles was released in Europe on 17 November for PlayStation and November 24 for Windows. The Dreamcast version was released in Europe on December 15. In North America, all three versions arrived on 26 November. The Windows version was published in Japan by Eidos on 19 January 2001, being the English version with a Japanese language manual. The PlayStation version was published by Capcom on 31 May. A version for Mac OS was developed by Westlake Interactive and published by Aspyr on 20 July 2001. Like the Windows version, the Mac OS port included the level editor.

Reception

The game received "mixed" reviews on all platforms according to the review aggregation website Metacritic. David Zdyrko of IGN was primarily mixed, especially to the PlayStation version, calling it the best game in the series, yet not so much different to the previous games. Frank O'Connor of MacLife also agreed the game was "the best Tomb Raider yet", but noted the series had not kept up with the rest of the gaming industry.

Ron Dulin of GameSpot was mixed; of the PC version, he said that the series hasn't grown up with the times. Joe Fielder was particularly complimentary of the graphics, specifically to the Playstation version, praising its details and level design. GamePro echoed the view that Tomb Raider was somewhat in need of an update, remarking of the latter console version that despite having the improved graphics and good story, Tomb Raider Chronicles has the same controls as previous Tomb Raider games, calling them as antiquated. David Chen of NextGen was positive of the same console version, but noticed its fatigue. In Japan, where the same console version was ported and published by Capcom under the name  on 31 May 2001, Famitsu gave it a score of 27 out of 40.

Joshua Roberts of Extended Play gave the PC version three stars out of five; while positive, he noticed that the game and the series should have gone into a new direction. Steve Bauman of Computer Games Strategy Plus was more critical, giving the same PC version two-and-a-half stars out of five; he was critical of Eidos publishing and producing the series every year, contributing to its series decline and its formula. Edge gave the game a score of four out of ten, calling the game as mediocre. Jon Thompson of AllGame gave the PlayStation version a similar score of two stars out of five, noticing its franchise fatigue and recommended the title to the fans who are accustomed to its formula.

Retrospective staff opinions of Chronicles have been mixed, with many staff feeling it was their worst Tomb Raider project at that time due to a lack of enthusiasm and franchise fatigue. In journalistic retrospectives, Chronicles has been ranked as one of the weakest 32-bit entries, and one of the worst Tomb Raider entries prior to the notoriously poor The Angel of Darkness.

In their financial report in February 2001, Eidos included Chronicles among the successful titles published during the late 2000 period. The game has sold 1.5 million units worldwide; this made Chronicles the worst-selling Tomb Raider game up to that point and the second worst-selling main title in the franchise.

References

Notes

External links
 Official website (archived 2001)
 

2000 video games
3D platform games
Capcom games
Core Design games
Dreamcast games
Eidos Interactive games
Classic Mac OS games
PlayStation (console) games
PlayStation Network games
Single-player video games
Square Enix franchises
Chronicles
Video games about cults
Video game sequels
Video games based on Celtic mythology
Video games based on mythology
Video games based on multiple mythologies
Video games scored by Peter Connelly
Video games set in Ireland
Video games set in New York City
Video games set in Rome
Video games set in Russia
Windows games
Aspyr games
Video games developed in the United Kingdom
Westlake Interactive games